Wundowie is a town in Western Australia located between Perth and Northam in the Darling Range. It was the location of an iron works, and siding and stopping place on the Eastern Railway.

It was named in 1907 and was a siding on the Chidlow to Northam section of the railway. The origin of the name is from nearby Woondowing Spring which is an Aboriginal word thought to come from Ngwundow, meaning "to lie down".

Following the decision of the government to construct the blast furnace and wood distillation plant (to produce charcoal) in 1943 at Wundowie, plans were made to develop the townsite. Lots were surveyed in 1946 and the town was gazetted in 1947.

The design of the town was based on the concepts of the garden city movement of town planning. This is reflected in its street pattern, subdivision layout, location of land uses, open space and the civic core of the town. Construction of the town was by the Western Australian Department of Housing.

The charcoal iron works commenced production in 1948,  and the railway station was opened in 1949. In 1974 the plant was sold to Agnew-Clough Ltd and upgraded. By 1979, a shortage of hardwood timber resulted in the saw mill being closed. In 1981 iron production ceased.

The railway line was continued for a while from Northam to service Wundowieafter the main closure of the Chidlows route and the opening of the Avon Valley route in 1966.

See also 

 Wundowie charcoal iron and wood distillation plant

References

Further reading
 Clayden, B. J. (1958) A short history of the wood distillation, charcoal, iron and steel industry, Wundowie: the plant and the town, Thesis – Graylands Teachers College – held in Battye Library
 Seabrook, Benjamin (2000) Wundowie the charcoal town. (reminisces about the town over the last 40 years). Avon Valley Advocate, 26 January 2000, p. 14
 Saunders, D. M. and Pearce, D. G. (1978) The financial viability to Westrail of railing iron ore from Koolyanobbing to Avon and Wundowie for Agnew Clough Perth, W.A. Westrail, Management Services Bureau, Planning Division

Towns in Western Australia
Shire of Northam